Connecticut's 1st congressional district is a congressional district in the U.S. state of Connecticut. Located in the north-central part of the state, the district is anchored by the state capital of Hartford. It encompasses much of central Connecticut and includes towns within Hartford, Litchfield, and Middlesex counties.

Principal cities include: Bristol, Hartford, and Torrington.

The district has been represented by Democrat John B. Larson since 1999.

Towns in the districtHartford County – Berlin, Bloomfield, Bristol, East Granby, East Hartford, East Windsor, Glastonbury (part), Granby, Hartford, Hartland, Manchester, Newington, Rocky Hill, Southington, South Windsor, West Hartford, Wethersfield, Windsor, and Windsor Locks.Litchfield County – Barkhamsted, Colebrook, New Hartford, Torrington (part), and Winchester.Middlesex County''' – Cromwell, Middletown (part), and Portland.

Voter registration

Recent presidential elections

Recent elections
The district has the lowest Republican voter performance of the five Connecticut house seats.  It has been in Democratic hands without interruption since 1957, and for all but six years since 1931.

List of members representing the district

References

 Congressional Biographical Directory of the United States 1774–present

1
Litchfield County, Connecticut
Hartford County, Connecticut
Middlesex County, Connecticut
Constituencies established in 1837
1837 establishments in Connecticut